Michele Lamberti (born 3 November 2000) is a competitive Italian swimmer. He is a former world record holder in the short course 4×50-metre medley relay. He currently holds the Italian record in the short course 50-metre backstroke. At the 2021 European Short Course Championships he won a gold medal and set a world record in the 4×50-metre medley relay, won three silver medals, one in the 50-metre backstroke, one in the 100-metre butterfly, and one in the 4×50-metre mixed medley relay, and won a bronze medal in the 200-metre backstroke. At the 2021 World Short Course Championships he won two bronze medals in relay events, swimming in the preliminaries for each relay.

Background
Lamberti was born 3 November 2000 in Brescia, Italy, to father Giorgio Lamberti a former world record holder and world champion in the short course 200-metre freestyle. He also has two siblings, Noemi and Matteo, both of whom are competitive swimmers. His mother, Tanya Vannini, was also a competitive swimmer at the international level. Lamberti is coached by his father, Giorgio Lamberti.

Career

2021

2021 European Short Course Championships

At the 2021 European Short Course Swimming Championships held at the Palace of Water Sports in Kazan, Russia in November, Lamberti started his competition on day one with an Italian record of 22.91 seconds in the 50-metre backstroke prelims heats that qualified him for the semifinals later the same day. In the same prelims session, Lamberti qualified for the semifinals of the 100-metre butterfly with a time of 50.17 seconds. In the evening semifinals session, he set a new Italian record in the 50-metre backstroke with his time of 22.79 seconds and advanced to the final ranked second. For the 100-metre butterfly semifinals, he advanced to the final with a personal best time of 50.11 seconds.

On day two of competition, 3 November, Lamberti made it three-for-three setting his third Italian record in the 50-metre backstroke in the third stage of competition, the final, with a time of 22.65 seconds, which earned him the silver medal in the event. He won the silver medal in his second event of the same finals session, the 100-metre butterfly, with a time of 49.79 seconds. In his third and final event of the session, Lamberti earned his first gold medal and set a Championships record and world record of 1:30.14 in the 4×50-metre medley relay with relay teammates Nicolò Martinenghi (breaststroke), Marco Orsi (butterfly), and Lorenzo Zazzeri (freestyle). Lamberti was the only person on the relay to lower the world record split for their stroke by more than two tenths of a second and he also set his fourth Italian record in the 50-metre backstroke with his lead-off time of 22.62 seconds.

The third day, Lamberti swam a personal best time of 50.86 seconds in the prelims heats of the 100 metre backstroke, ranked seventh overall, and did not advance to the semifinals as he was not one of the two fastest Italians in the event. Fourth day of competition, a similar situation arose, Lamberti swam a personal best time of 22.81 seconds in the 50-metre butterfly prelims heats, ranking behind Italians Matteo Rivolta and Thomas Ceccon and thus not advancing to the semifinals even though he ranked twelfth overall. Day five, he advanced to the semifinals of the 200-metre backstroke with a time of 1:54.45 in the prelims heats, which ranked him ninth amongst semifinals qualifiers and eleventh overall. In the semifinals, he dropped almost two and a half seconds off his prelims time, swimming a 1:52.01 and advancing the final.

Lamberti swam a 1:50.26 in the final of the 200-metre backstroke on the sixth and final day of competition, lowering his personal best time from the semifinals by over a second and a half, and winning the bronze medal in the event. In the final of the 4×50-metre mixed medley relay, Lamberti split a time of 22.72 seconds for the backstroke leg of the relay to win the silver medal and achieve a new Italian record at 1:36.39 in the event with his relay teammates of Nicolò Martinenghi (breaststroke), Elena Di Liddo (butterfly), and Silvia Di Pietro (freestyle).

2021 Nico Sapio Trophy
At the 47th Nico Sapio Trophy held in Genoa, Lamberti won the gold medal in the short course 200 metre butterfly with a personal best time of 1:53.94, which was a drop of 2.01 seconds from his previous best time in the race. Earlier in the competition, Lamberti won the bronze medal in the 200 metre freestyle with a time of 1:46.53, which was 1.00 seconds behind his brother and silver medalist in the event Matteo Lamberti.

2021 World Short Course Championships

Two weeks before the start of competition at the 2021 World Short Course Championships in Abu Dhabi, United Arab Emirates, Lamberti and his brother were named to the Italian roster for the Championships. He entered to compete in the 50 metre backstroke, 200 metre backstroke, and 100 metre butterfly individual events. Starting competition on day two, Lamberti ranked 14th in the prelims heats of the 100 metre butterfly with a time of 50.53 seconds and qualified for the semifinals of the event. In the evening semifinals, Lamberti swam a 50.12, ranked 12th overall and did not advance to the final. The morning of day three, Lamberti advanced to the semifinals ranking tenth in the prelims heats of the 50 metre backstroke with a 23.50. In his second event of the morning, Lamberti split a 23.44 for the backstroke leg of the 4×50 metre mixed medley relay, helping to achieve a rank of fourth and qualify the relay to the final. Later in the day, Lamberti swam a 23.15 in the semifinals of the 50 metre backstroke to qualify for the final ranking sixth. For the final of the 4×50 metre mixed medley relay, Lorenzo Mora substituted in for Lamberti for the backstroke leg of the relay, the finals relay finished third, and all prelims and finals relay members won a bronze medal.

On day four, Lamberti placed fifth in the final of the 50 metre backstroke with a time of 22.94 seconds. The following day Lamberti split a 22.84 for the butterfly leg of the 4×50 metre medley relay, helping advance the relay to the final ranking fifth overall at 1:33.60. In the final, Matteo Rivolta substituted in for Lamberti, the finals relay placed third in 1:30.78, and Lamberti won a bronze medal for his contributions in the prelims heats. In the morning prelims heats on the sixth and final day of competition, Lamberti did not qualify for the final of the 200 metre backstroke with his time of 1:52.52 and ranking of eleventh.

2022

2022 World Aquatics Championships

As part of the 4×100 metre mixed medley relay at the 2022 World Aquatics Championships, with pool swimming conducted at Danube Arena in Budapest, Hungary in June, Lamberti split a 54.40 for the backstroke leg of the relay in the preliminaries to help qualify the relay for the final ranking seventh. For the finals relay, Thomas Ceccon substituted in for him on the backstroke leg of the relay and the relay placed fifth in a time of 3:41.67. The following day, he placed 21st in the 200 metre backstroke with a time of 2:00.92. On 24 June, he swam a time of 25.16 seconds in the preliminaries of the 50 metre backstroke, tying for sixteenth rank. In the semifinals, he lowered his time to 24.86 seconds and placed eleventh.

2022 European Aquatics Championships

The month following the World Championships, Lamberti was officially confirmed as a swim team member for Italy for the 2022 European Aquatics Championships in August in Rome. The second day of competition, he led-off the 4×100 metre mixed medley relay in the prelims heats with a 54.67, helping qualify the relay to the final ranking sixth. On the finals relay, Thomas Ceccon substituted in for him and he won a silver medal for his contributions when the relay placed second in a time of 3:43.61. Two days later, in the preliminaries of the 50 metre backstroke, he qualified for the semifinals ranking fifth with a time of 24.88 seconds. In the semifinals, he retained his fifth-rank, lowering his time to a 24.82 and qualifying for the final. He placed fifth in the final as well, this time finishing in a time of 24.85 seconds. The following day, he ranked sixth in the preliminaries of the 100 metre backstroke, qualifying for the semifinals with a time of 54.37 seconds. He finished with a time of 54.56 seconds in the semifinals, placing thirteenth and not advancing to the final. On the seventh and final day, Lamberti helped qualify the 4×100 metre medley relay to the final ranking first with a time of 3:34.35, swimming the backstroke portion of the relay in 54.95 seconds. In the final, he was substituted out, Thomas Ceccon in, and he won a gold medal for his efforts when the finals relay placed first with a time of 3:28.46.

International championships (50 m)

 Lamberti swam only in the prelims heats.

International championships (25 m)

 Lamberti swam only in the prelims heats.

Personal best times

Long course metres (50 m pool)

Legend: sf – semifinal

Short course metres (25 m pool)

World records

Short course metres (25 m pool)

 split 22.62 (backstroke); with Nicolò Martinenghi (breaststroke), Marco Orsi (butterfly), Lorenzo Zazzeri (freestyle)

Continental and national records

Short course metres (25 m pool)

See also
 List of world records in swimming
 World record progression 4 × 50 metres medley relay
 List of European Short Course Swimming Championships medalists (men)

References

External links
 

2000 births
Living people
World record setters in swimming
Italian male backstroke swimmers
Italian male butterfly swimmers
Medalists at the FINA World Swimming Championships (25 m)
21st-century Italian people
European Aquatics Championships medalists in swimming
Sportspeople from Brescia